HAPPinas Happy Hour is a Philippine sketch comedy and variety show created by Wilma V. Galvante and produced by TV5 Entertainment Division and Content Cows Company. The show premiered on TV5 on May 6, 2016 and ended on September 30, 2016. The show's comedy sketches, which parody contemporary culture and politics, are performed by a large and varying cast of repertory and newer cast members.

History

Happy Truck ng Bayan
The show was originally a noontime variety show produced by TV5 and was started airing since June 14, 2015. HTNB is airing every Sunday, 11:00am to 1:00pm on TV5, and it is the biggest project of TV5 on that year and hosted by Janno Gibbs, Derek Ramsay, Tuesday Vargas, Kim Idol and former Kapamilya and Kapuso stars. The show ended last February 7, 2016.

Happy Truck HAPPinas
In 2015, VIVA Communications, Inc. made an agreement with TV5 that they will be the official production outfit to handle all the Entertainment requirements of TV5. On February 7, 2016, HTNB marks their final episode. It will be replaced by a similarly formatted program, Happy Truck HAPPinas, that set to premiere live on March 6, 2016 with same hosts and same timeslot. It formally ended last May 1, 2016.

Cast

Hosts
 Eula Caballero 
 Tuesday Vargas  
 Maria Ozawa 
 Mark Neumann 
 Margo Midwinter 
 Abby Poblador

Former hosts
 Gelli de Belen (now on ABS-CBN)
 Yassi Pressman (now on ABS-CBN)
 Ogie Alcasid  (now on ABS-CBN)
 Daiana Menezes (now on GMA Network)
 Ella Cruz (now on GMA Network)
 Kim Idol (now on GMA Network)
 Janno Gibbs (returned on GMA Network)
 Empoy  (now on ABS-CBN)
 Alwyn Uytingco  (quits showbiz)

See also
List of programs broadcast by TV5
 Happy Truck ng Bayan
 Happy Truck HAPPinas

References

External links
TV5 website

TV5 (Philippine TV network) original programming
2016 Philippine television series debuts
2016 Philippine television series endings
Philippine variety television shows
Filipino-language television shows